Live at Shepherds Bush Empire is a live DVD by folk band Bellowhead, recorded in 2007 on the Burlesque tour and released in 2009.

The DVD features Bellowhead's tour diary as well as Bellowhead talking about themselves and the formation of the band.

Track listing 
"Prickle-Eye Bush"
"Jack Robinson"
"Outlandish Knight"
"Across the Line"
"London Town"
"Haul Away"
"Spectre Review"
"Rigs of the Time"
"If You Will Not Have Me, You May Let Me Go"
"Death and the Lady"
"Hopkinson's Favourite"
"Flash Company"
"The Rochdale Coconut Dance"
"Fire Marengo"
"Sloe Gin"
"Jordan"
"Frog's Legs and Dragon's Teeth"

Personnel 
Jon Boden - lead vocals, fiddle, tambourine
John Spiers - melodeon, Anglo-concertina
Benji Kirkpatrick - guitar, bouzouki, mandolin, tenor banjo
Andy Mellon - trumpet, flugelhorn
Justin Thurgur - trombone
Brendan Kelly - saxophone, bass clarinet
Gideon Juckes - Helicon, Tuba
Pete Flood - percussion
Rachael McShane - cello, fiddle
Paul Sartin - fiddle, oboe
Giles Lewin - fiddle, bagpipes

Bellowhead albums
Shepherd's Bush